The Shilin Official Residence  is the former residence of late Republic of China President Chiang Kai-shek located on Zhongshan North Road in Shilin District, Taipei, Taiwan.

History

During the Japanese Colonial era on Taiwan, it was the location of the Shilin Horticultural Experimental Station. After the Republic of China lost the Chinese Civil War in 1949 and retreated to Taiwan, the property was requisitioned to the government and transformed into the residence of Chiang Kai-shek and Soong Mei-ling by architect Yang Cho-cheng.  Construction was completed by the Continental Engineering Corporation In the early days of the Republic of China on Taiwan, the residence was heavily militarized, fortified, and closed to the public.

Since 1996, it has been open to the public and is a popular place for viewing the gardens. The gardens include both Chinese- and Western-style horticulture. In addition to the gardens, the official residence includes the former home of Chiang Kai-shek and Soong Mei-ling. The official residence is a two-story western-style home. The residence is currently open to the public as of 2 January 2011. In addition, the grounds include Madame Chiang Kai-shek's former Cadillac limousine, Chiang Kai-shek's personal Victory Chapel, and the Xinlan Pavilion (新蘭亭) with inscription by Yu Youren, which hosted Chiang's birthday celebrations. Former President Chen Shui-bian revealed that the grounds contain the entrance to a hidden tunnel that connects to the Presidential Office Building in Zhongzheng District, Taipei.

Famous guests
The residence has hosted famous guests and foreign dignitaries visiting Taiwan, including then President of the United States of America, Dwight D. Eisenhower, and U.S. Secretary of State John Foster Dulles. In 1971, then Governor of California, Ronald Reagan, stayed at the residence when he was in Taipei as the United States representative to the Double Ten Day Celebrations.

Transportation
The residence is within walking distance of Shilin Station on the Taipei Metro.

See also
 Guesthouses of Chiang Kai-shek
 Seven Seas Residence

References

External links

Taipei City Government Shilin

Buildings and structures in Taipei
Presidential residences in Taiwan
National monuments of Taiwan